The pygmy mulga snake (Pseudechis weigeli), also commonly known as the pygmy king brown snake, is a species of venomous snake in the black snake genus Pseudechis in the family Elapidae. The species is native to Australia.

Geographic range
In Australia P. weigeli is endemic to the Kimberley ranges.

Habitat
The preferred natural habitats of P. weigeli are forest and savanna.

Reproduction
P. weigeli is ovoviviparous.

Taxonomy
P. weigeli was genetically confirmed as a distinct species in 2017. Within the genus Pseudechis it is most closely related to the eastern dwarf mulga snake (P. pailsei) and an as yet undescribed species from the Northern Territory.

Etymology
The specific name, weigeli, is in honor of Australian herpetologist John Randall Weigel (born 1955).

References

Further reading
Cogger HG (2014). Reptiles and Amphibians of Australia, Seventh Edition. Clayton, Victoria, Australia: CSIRO Publishing. xxx + 1,033 pp. .
Wells RW, Wellington CR (1987). "A new species of proteroglyphous snake (Serpentes: Oxyuranidae) from Australia". Australian Herpetologist (503): 1-8. (Cannia weigeli, new species).
Wilson S, Swan G (2013). A Complete Guide to Reptiles of Australia, Fourth Edition. Sydney: New Holland Publishers. 522 pp. .
Wüster W, Dumbrell AJ, Hay C, Pook CE, Williams DJ, Fry BG (2004). "Snakes across the Strait: trans-Torresian phylogeographic relationships in three genera of Australasian snakes (Serpentes: Elapidae: Acanthophis, Oxyuranus, and Pseudechis)". Molecular Phylogenetics and Evolution 34 (1): 1–14. (Pseudechis weigeli, new combination).

Pseudechis
Reptiles described in 1987
Snakes of Australia